Jai Mummy Di is a 2020 Indian Hindi-language romantic comedy film directed by debutant Navjot Gulati starring Sunny Singh and Sonnalli Seygall. The film also features actors Supriya Pathak and Poonam Dhillon. It was produced by Luv Films and distributed by T-Series. The film tells the story of conflicting dynamics between mothers of protagonists and how that is affecting them and other members of both the families. The film was theatrically released in India on 17 January 2020.

The film brings Singh and Seygall back together on-screen after Pyaar Ka Punchnama 2.

Plot
lovestruck couple decides to take their relationship to the next level and get married. However, they hit a bumpy road when they learn that their mothers do not like each other.

Cast 
 Sunny Singh as Puneet Khanna
 Sonnalli Seygall as Saanjh Bhalla
 Supriya Pathak as Laali Khanna
 Poonam Dhillon as Pinky Bhalla
 Shiwani Saini as Shruti Sethi
 Bhuvan Arora as Dev
 Rajendra Sethi as Trilochan Khanna
 Danish Husain as Gurpal Bhalla
 Veer Rajwant Singh as Vineet
 Alok Nath as Sanjog Luthra (Sanju Ji)
 Neeraj Sood as Jasbir Bhullar
 Sharat Saxena as Pinky's father
 Sukhwinder Chahal as Jagat Mama
 Sandeep D Bose as Shammi Mama
 vasundhara Kaul as Sakshi Bhatia
 Tina Bhatia as Teri 
 Himika Bose as Ashleen
 Amardeep Jha as Shruti's mother

Special appearances
 Nushrratt Bharuccha as Young Laali Khanna
 Ishita Raj Sharma as Young Pinky Bhalla
 Varun Sharma as Young Sanjog Luthra 
 Neha Kakkar in song "Lamborghini"
 Jassi Gill in song "Lamborghini"

Production 
The film has been shot in many locations of which one being Raj Nagar, Ghaziabad Sector 7.

Release 
The film was released on 17 January 2020.

Soundtrack 

The film's music was composed by Amartya Bobo Rahut, Tanishk Bagchi, Meet Bros, Parag Chhabra, Rishi-Siddhant and Gaurav Chatterji with lyrics written by Kumaar, Shellee, Siddharth Kaushal, Jaani, Ginny Diwan, Gautam G. Sharma and Gurpreet Saini.

The song Mummy Nu Pasand is a remake of the 2017 hit Punjabi single Jaani Teri Naa, originally produced by Sukh-E Musical Doctorz, which was recreated for the film by Tanishk Bagchi.

The song Lamborghini is a rehash of the 2018 Punjabi song Lamberghini, written and composed by The Doorbeen, and featuring Ragini Tandan, which is in turn based on a traditional folk song Chitta Kukkad.

References

External links
 
 
 

Indian romantic comedy films
Films scored by Gaurav Chatterji
2020s Hindi-language films
T-Series (company) films
2020 films
2020 romantic comedy films
Films distributed by Yash Raj Films